The Confederation of Passenger Transport (CPT) is an advocacy group representing operators of the UK buses and coaches. As well as providing services to its members, it acts as a primary voice of the industry to the government on national and international legislation, local regulations, operational practices and engineering standards.

History
The Confederation of Passenger Transport was formed in 1974 following the forming of passenger transport authorities, and other changes in the industry following the Transport Act 1968. It was the successor to the 'Passenger Vehicle Operators’ Association', the 'Scottish Road Passenger Transport Association' and the 'PRTA'.

References

External links
 Official website

Bus transport in the United Kingdom
Coach transport in the United Kingdom